HMS Recruit was a Cherokee-class brig-sloop built at the HM Portsmouth Dockyard, and launched on 17 August 1829. She became a packet for the Post Office packet service, sailing from Falmouth, Cornwall.

On 29 May 1832, she sailed from Falmouth (or Bermuda – accounts differ), bound for Halifax, Nova Scotia (or Bermuda), under the command of Lieutenant Thomas Hodges, RN. She disappeared without trace, presumed foundered in the Atlantic Ocean with the death of all aboard.

Citations

References
 
 

1829 ships
Ships built in Portsmouth
Cherokee-class brig-sloops
Maritime incidents in June 1832
Shipwrecks in the Atlantic Ocean
Ships lost with all hands